Rufoclanis maccleeryi is a moth of the family Sphingidae. It is known from Tanzania and Kenya.

The length of the forewings is 32 mm. The ground colour of the upperside of the forewings is light pinkish cinnamon, sprinkled with brown scales and darker beyond the medial line. There is a large, irregular warm sepia spot at the base. The ground colour of the upperside of the hindwings is more reddish than the forewings, with a large terra cotta area at the base. The ground colour of the underside of the forewings is terra cotta for the basal half, while the remainder is cinnamon. The underside of the hindwings is light pinkish cinnamon from the base to the medial area, which is straight and well defined.

References

Rufoclanis
Moths described in 1968
Insects of Tanzania
Moths of Africa